Marine Rotational Force-Darwin is a United States Marine Corps Marine Air-Ground Task Force based at Matilda Lines at Robertson Barracks and at RAAF Base Darwin.

On 16 November 2011, Prime Minister Julia Gillard and President Barack Obama announced that starting in 2012 US Marines would deploy to Darwin on a rotational basis for about six months to conduct exercises and train with the Australian Defence Force in the Northern Territory. The first rotation of about 200 US Marines deployed to Australia in April 2012. On 14 June 2013, the Prime Minister announced that in 2014 the size of the deployment would increase to 1150 US Marines to be based at Robertson Barracks. Since then, that number has increased to 2,500. During the six-month deployment, Marines train with their Australian counterparts in live fire exercises which builds comradery and combat effectiveness between the two coalition forces.  Both forces train the other in their military methods which include artillery fire, Infantry tactics, communications equipment, and other various military trainings.

Assets
 Key
 GCE = Ground Combat Element
 ACE = Aviation Combat Element
 LCE = Logistic Combat Element
 MRF-D (April – October 2012)
 GCE – Fox Company, 2nd Battalion 3rd Marines
 MRF-D (April – October 2013)
 GCE – Lima Company, 3rd Battalion 3rd Marines
 MRF-D (April – October 2014)
 GCE – 1st Battalion 5th Marines 
 ACE – Marine Heavy Helicopter Squadron 463 (HMH-463) with Sikorsky CH-53E Super Stallions
 LCE – Combat Logistics Regiment 3 (CLR-3)
 MRF-D (April – October 2015)
 GCE – 1st Battalion 4th Marines
 ACE – HMH-463 with Sikorsky CH-53E Super Stallions
 MRF-D (April – October 2016)
 GCE – 1st Battalion 1st Marines
 ACE – Marine Light Attack Helicopter Squadron 367 (HMLA-367) with Bell UH-1Y Venoms.
 MRF-D 17.2 (April – October 2017)
 GCE – 3rd Battalion 4th Marines
 ACE – Marine Light Attack Helicopter Squadron 367 (HMLA-367) with Bell AH-1Z Vipers, and Bell UH-1Y Venoms. Marine Medium Tiltrotor Squadron 268 (VMM-268) with Bell Boeing MV-22B Ospreys.
 MRF-D 18.2 (April – October 2018)
 GCE – 2nd Battalion 4th Marines
 GCE – Mike Battery, 3rd Battalion 11th Marines
 ACE – Marine Medium Tiltrotor Squadron 268 (VMM-268) with Bell Boeing MV-22B Ospreys.
 MRF-D 19.2 (April – October 2019)
 GCE – 1st Battalion, 1st Marines
 GCE – India Battery, 3rd Battalion, 11th Marines
 ACE – Marine Medium Tiltrotor Squadron 363 (VMM-363) with Bell Boeing MV-22B Ospreys. Marine Light Attack Helicopter Squadron 367 (HMLA-367) with Bell AH-1Z Vipers, and Bell UH-1Y Venoms
 LCE – Combat Logistics Battalion 1
 MRF-D 20.2 (April - October 2020)
 GCE - 3rd Battalion 7th Marines
 GCE - Kilo Battery, 3rd Battalion, 11th Marines
 ACE - Detachment, VMU-3
 LCE - Combat Logistics Battalion 5

References

External links

US Marines 
DVIDS 

Ad hoc units and formations of the United States Marine Corps
Australia–United States military relations
Darwin, Northern Territory